

Hardware

Accessories
Finderscope
Iron sight
Reflector (reflex) sight
Cheshire collimator: A simple tool to collimate a telescope

Control
Clock drive
GoTo

Mechanical construction
Mirror support cell
Serrurier truss
Silvering

Mounts
Telescope mount - Types include:
 Altazimuth mount
 Equatorial mount
 Equatorial platform 
 Poncet Platform
 Fork mount
 German equatorial mount
 Springfield mount

Optics
Mirrors and lenses are the critical light-bending components of a telescope.
Objective: The first lens or curved mirror that collects and focuses the incoming light.
Primary lens: The objective of a refracting telescope.
Primary mirror: The objective of a reflecting telescope.
Corrector plate: A full aperture negative lens placed before a primary mirror designed to correct the optical aberrations of the mirror.  
Schmidt corrector plate: An aspheric-shaped corrector plate used in the Schmidt telescope.
Meniscus corrector: A meniscus-shaped corrector plate usually used in the Maksutov telescope.
Focusing mask: A full aperture mask temporarily placed before the primary mirror to aid in focusing the telescope.
Bahtinov mask
Carey mask
Hartmann mask
Sub-aperture corrector: One or a series of corrective lens (sometimes combined with a corrective curved mirror) placed after (near the focus) a primary mirror designed to correct the optical aberrations of the mirror. These can be just a small version of the corrector plate, but since they are usually used in a Cassegrain configuration in front of the secondary mirror they require additional modification since the light passes through them twice.  
Secondary mirror
Mirror#Instruments
Curved mirror
Honeycomb mirror
Liquid mirror
Parabolic reflector
Subsequent (sometimes optional) components realign, segment, or in some way modify the light of an incoming image:
Field lens: A correcting lens placed just before the image plane of a telescope.
Telecompressor or focal reducer: Optical element to decrease the telescope's focal length and magnification (usually by a fixed percentage) and widen the field of view, providing opposite effects of a Barlow lens.
Star Diagonal: Used to change the angle of the light coming out of a telescope, for easier viewing.
Herschel Wedge: Similar to a star diagonal with a wedge-shaped unsilvered prism reflector that reduces incoming light by up to 95% for solar viewing.
Coma corrector a correcting lens used to reduce coma distortion in fast reflecting telescopes.
Field flattener a correcting lens used to reduce field curvature in refracting telescopes for astrophotography.
Barlow lens: Optical element to increase the telescope's focal length and magnification, narrow the field of view and reduce coma distortion, providing opposite effects of a telecompressor.
Astronomical filter: Used to select specific colors (or light frequencies) for astrophotography.
Filter wheel: One manner to easily insert filters into the optical train.  Mostly used for photography.
Focuser: Allows the user to adjust the focus by moving the eyepiece along the optical axis.
Eyepiece: Performs the final focus correction before the light reaches the eye.
Charge-coupled device (CCD): A light-sensitive integrated circuit digital sensor (commonly used in digital cameras) that turns light into an electrical charge used to collection image data.

Generally applicable to all items:
Metallizing: A way of coating mirrors for high-efficiency light reflection.
Optical coating: Thin layers applied to mirrors, filters, and lenses to avoid reflections, as well as absorb certain colors.

Software and control interfaces
Active optics
Adaptive optics
ASCOM
EQMod
INDI
PLate OPtimizer
Versatile Real-Time Executive

Support equipment and buildings
Observatory
Equatorial room

See also
List of telescope types
Lists of telescopes

Astronomy-related lists
Parts and construction
Telescope